Paavo Hietala (26 September 1919 – 18 September 1984) was a Finnish wrestler. He competed in the men's freestyle featherweight at the 1948 Summer Olympics.

References

External links
 

1919 births
1984 deaths
Finnish male sport wrestlers
Olympic wrestlers of Finland
Wrestlers at the 1948 Summer Olympics
People from Lapua
Sportspeople from South Ostrobothnia